Chance to Shine is a charitable organisation in the UK.  It was also a 10-year programme run by the charitable Cricket Foundation to encourage competitive cricket in state schools in the UK, running from 2004 to 2015.  The Cricket Foundation was founded by the England and Wales Cricket Board in 1981, tasked with supporting grassroots cricket.  Reflecting the success of the programme, the Cricket Foundation was itself renamed Chance to Shine in 2015 shortly before the originally programme came to an end, and a new 5-year programme running to 2020 was announced.

Devised and implemented by former cricketer Nick Gandon, it launched with pilot programmes launched in March 2005 - immediately before the 2005 Ashes series - it aimed to establish regular coaching and competitive cricket in a third of state schools - 5,200 primary and 1,500 secondary schools - by 2015.  Before it was launched, research indicated that cricket was played regularly in less than 10% of state schools, and was only the sixth most popular sport played in schools, with many cricket pitches lost when school playing fields had been sold for development.

The main aim of the programme was educational, using cricket as a means of developing personal skills and values in the children involved - including leadership, teamwork, respect, individual and collective responsibility, and general standards of conduct - rather than trying to identify cricketing talent.  Opportunities were provided to both sexes, from a wide range of cultural backgrounds, including those with special needs.  The programme operated in a devolved manner, encouraging small local projects involving around six schools, supported by professional coaches and a local cricket club.  The Cricket Foundation was able to provide the schools with equipment and facilities.

Chance to Shine was supported, both financially and logistically, by the England and Wales Cricket Board and other cricketing bodies, including the Authors Cricket Club, Marylebone Cricket Club, the Lord's Taverners, and the Professional Cricketers' Association.  Half of its £50 million programme was funded by private donors, with private fundraising matched by government funding through Sport England.  It is estimated that 200,000 children were involved in its first four years of operation. By 2015, over 2.5 million children had participated, at 11,000 state schools.  The successor programme to 2020 aims to reach another 1 million children, with a budget of £25 million.

In June 2022, Lauren Bell and Issy Wong became the first full Chance to Shine participants to play for England.

The President of the programme is Mervyn King, former Governor of the Bank of England, with vice presidents including Duncan Fearnley, Lord Ian MacLaurin, Lord Bill Morris, Mark Nicholas, Lord Swraj Paul and Sir Tim Rice.

The chief executive of the Cricket Foundation was former first-class cricketer Wasim Khan.  Khan moved to Leicester County Cricket Club in 2014, and was replaced as chief executive by Luke Swanson.  As of 2016, the trustees of the charity include Donald Brydon (chairman since 2014), Danny Alexander, Charlotte Edwards, and Tim O'Gorman.

References

Further reading
Chance to Shine website
Chance to shine, ECB
Chance to Shine building on openers’ vision, The Times, 20 May 2010
Chance to Shine sheds light on English cricket's eager underclass, The Guardian, 8 July 2009
Cricket 'has spin-off for pupils', BBC News,  9 September 2009 
Grassroots plan, BBC Sport, 2 August 2005
New year sparks change at Chance to Shine, 2015

Cricket administration in England
Cricket administration in Scotland
Cricket administration in Wales